Robert Lamoot (born 18 March 1911 in Ostend (Belgium), died 15 June 1996) was a Belgian footballer.

Biography 

He played as a striker for Daring Club de Bruxelles and then Royal Olympic de Charleroi in the 1930s.

He was a member of the Diables Rouges. He scored the only goal on his debut, on 22 October 1933, a heavy defeat in Duisbourg, against Germany (8–1). 
He played seven times for the national team, with the last match in 1939.

Honours 
 Belgian international from 1933 to 1939 (7 caps, 2 goals)
 First international match: 22 October 1933, Germany-Belgium (8–1)
 Picked for the 1934 World Cup in Italy (did not play)
 Champions of Belgium in 1936 and 1937 with DC Bruxelles
 Runners-up of Belgium in 1934 and 1938 with DC Bruxelles
 Belgian Cup winners in 1935 with DC Bruxelles

References 

Belgian footballers
Belgium international footballers
1934 FIFA World Cup players
R. Olympic Charleroi Châtelet Farciennes players
1911 births
Sportspeople from Ostend
Footballers from West Flanders
1996 deaths
Association football forwards